Černívsko is a small village and part of the municipality of Uzeničky in the Strakonice District of the South Bohemian Region, the Czech Republic. It is located about 2 km southwest of Uzeničky and has 26 addresses registered. As of 2011, the village had a population of 23.

Černívsko is located in the cadastral area of Uzeničky with an area of 6.62 km2.

History 

The first written mention of the village dates back to the year 1352.

Sights 
 Church of the Holy Trinity – originally a Gothic church from the 14th century, was modified in Baroque style in 1722. It is the parish church of the Roman Catholic parish of Černívsko.
 Křikava

References

External links 
 

Villages in Strakonice District